A blunderbuss is a type of muzzle-loading firearm. 

Blunderbuss may also refer to:
 Blunderbuss (album), a 2012 album by Jack White
 Blunderbuss, a 2004 EP by Teddy Thompson

See also
 Blunderbore, a giant of Cornish folklore